Maryam Tousi (born 5 December 1988 in Tehran) is an Iranian sprint athlete who specializes in the 100 metres and 200 metres. She is the Iranian record holder in the 100 m, 200 m, 400 m and 4×400 m relay.

References

 Profile

External links
 

Living people
1988 births
Iranian female sprinters
Athletes (track and field) at the 2006 Asian Games
Athletes (track and field) at the 2010 Asian Games
Athletes (track and field) at the 2014 Asian Games
Asian Games competitors for Iran
Islamic Solidarity Games competitors for Iran
Islamic Solidarity Games medalists in athletics
21st-century Iranian women